John (Ioannes, "John the Sanguinary"), the nephew of the rebel Vitalian, was an Eastern Roman general under Justinian I (r. 527–565), who was active in the Gothic War in Italy and against the Gepids in the western Balkans. He was married to Justina, the daughter of Justinian's cousin Germanus.

Biography

Origins and family
John was the nephew of Vitalian, consul for 520 and magister militum praesentalis of Emperor Justin I, who was assassinated, probably at the instigation of Justinian, the powerful nephew and later successor of Justin.

Gothic War
In 537 John sailed from Constantinople to Italy with 8,000 Thracian troops to reinforce the army of Belisarius who engaged in the Gothic War against the Ostrogoths of King Witiges. Aftering landing in Taranto, he reached Rome and was besieged by the Goths in December 537. He had brought with him men and supplies essential to continue to resist the siege for a long time. In the winter of 537/538, Belisarius ordered John, quartered for the winter in Picenum, to attack the Gothic territory in order to push Witiges to lift the siege of Rome. John quickly reached Rimini, just one day's march from the Gothic capital of Ravenna. Witiges was forced to leave Rome to return to defend his capital. John was supposed to leave Rimini and head to Rome before the arrival of the Gothic army, but he remained in the city. The Goths, coming from Rome, put it under siege inside Rimini. Belisarius did not move to help John. It was the arrival of Justinian's eunuch Narses and a personal friend of John who saved him from the siege (mid-538).

When the rivalry between Narses and Belisarius and their disagreement on how to wage the war generated divisions in the army, John sided with Narses, following him in Emilia, which the eunuch intended to conquer even without Belisarius's authorization. John contributed to the conquest of Emilia along with other supporters of Narses, but the divisions of the army that had formed due to the discord between Belisarius and Narses contributed to the fall of Milan to the Goths, persuading Justinian to recall Narses and give back the unitary command to Belisarius (539).

After the conquest of Ravenna and the recall of Belisarius to Constantinople (540), John remained in Italy. Due to a unitary command after the recall of Belisarius, the Goths were able to recover under the leadership of their new king Totila. When the latter arrived to besiege Florence, the general at the head of the garrison of Florence, Justinus, asked for help from the imperial commanders in Ravenna, who intervened in force forcing Totila to lift the siege by retreating in the direction of Mugello, where he routed the imperial army due to the false news of the killing by one of its bodyguards of John, which panicked the Byzantine army. John fled to Rome, where he took refuge and remained for the next two years, until 544, when he was replaced by Bessas by order of Belisarius, who had returned to Italy. While in Rome, John expelled the Arian priests, fearing that they might conspire something for the benefit of the Goths.

In 545 he was sent by Belisarius to Constantinople to ask for reinforcements, but John lingered a long time, marrying Justina, the daughter of Germanus. According to the Secret History of Procopius, Theodora did not want Justina to marry so John, by marrying her, would have attracted the hatred of the empress, to the point that John, fearing that Theodora could order Antonina (Belisarius's wife) to kill him, when he returned to Italy he was careful not to reach Belisarius and his wife in Rome. On the other hand, John managed to recover Lucania and Bruzio for the Empire.

In 550, when Narses obtained the command of the Roman troops, John joined him to balance the elderly eunuch's lack of experience. Narses reached Ravenna in the summer of 552, and within a year was able to break the resistance of the last Ostrogothic king, Teia, and to put an end to the war (late 552 or early 553).

In fiction
John appears as a character in the time travel novel Lest Darkness Fall, by L. Sprague de Camp.

References

Sources

Hughes, Ian. (2009). Belisarius: The Last Roman General. Westholme Publishing
Heather, Peter. (2018). Rome Resurgent: War and Empire in the Age of Justinian. Oxford University Press
Hodgkin, Thomas. Italy and her invaders: imperial restoration. Forgotten Books

6th-century deaths
6th-century Byzantine military personnel
Byzantine generals
Generals of Justinian I
Magistri militum
People of the Gothic War (535–554)
Year of birth unknown